Yelizavetino is a rural locality (a village) in Adzitarovsky Selsoviet, Karmaskalinsky District, Bashkortostan, Russia. The population was 7 as of 2010. There is 1 street.

Geography 
Yelizavetino is located 45 km southwest of Karmaskaly (the district's administrative centre) by road. Tansaitovo is the nearest rural locality.

References 

Rural localities in Karmaskalinsky District